HMS Reserve was one of six 40-gun fourth-rate frigates, built for the Commonwealth of England under the 1650 Programme, after the Restoration of the monarchy in 1660 she was incorporated into the navy of the Kingdom of England. She partook in no major Fleet actions during the First Anglo-Dutch War. After the Restoration during the Second Anglo-Dutch War she partook in the Battle of Lowestoft, the Four Days' Battle and the St James Day Battle. She spent the bulk of her service either in the Mediterranean or at Newfoundland. She foundered off Yarmouth in November 1703.

Reserve was the first named vessel in the Eglish and Royal Navies.

Construction and specifications
She was ordered in December 1649 to be built under contract by Peter Pett II at Woodbridge on the River Thames. She was launched in 1650. Her tonnage was  tons. Her tonnage was 573 tons.

Her gun armament in 1653 was 44 guns. In 1666 her armament was 48 guns and consisted of twenty-two culverins on the lower deck (LD), twenty demi-culverines on the upper deck and six sakers on the quarterdeck (QD). In 1685 her guns were established at 48 guns. She now carried twenty-two culverins, twenty-two demi-culverins and four sakers Her manning was 180 personnel in 1653 and 1666.

She was completed with a first cost of £3,334 or 513 tons @ £6.10.0d per ton.

Commissioned service

Service in the Commonwealth Navy
She was commissioned in 1650 under the command of Captain Robert Clarke for the North Coast. Later in 1653 she was under Captain Robert Taylor. In 1654 Captain Robert Plumleigh was in command for operations in the Sound in 1659. Then she sailed to Newfoundland for fishery protection in 1660.

Service after the Restoration May 1660
From 9 August 1662 until 29 September 1663 she was under the command of Captain Robert Holmes. Captain John Hayward held command from 4 September1664 until 2 April 1665.

Second Anglo-Dutch War
Captain John Tyrwitt took command on 4 April 1665. She was at the Battle of Lowestoft as a member of White Squadron, Center Division on 3 June 1665. She arrived at the Four Days' Battle on 4 June 1666 with Prince Rupert's Squadron as a member of the Rear Division. She partook in the St James Day Battle as a member of Blue Squadron, Rear Division on 25 July 1666. Captain Ralph Lassels held command from 23 September 1666 until 19 January 1667 when Captain Christopher Gunman took over. The Second Anglo-Dutch War ended on 31 July 1667.

Captain Gunman remained in command until 3 August 1668. Captain Thomas Elliot held command from 23 August to 15 January 1672. Captain Jasper Grant was her commander from 28 April 1672 until 14 October 1673. She went to the Mediterranean in 1673, when he was relieved of command then dismissed from the Navy by court-martial in 1674. Captain Thomas Willshaw took over command on 17 October and remained her commander until 27 June 1674 remaining in the Mediterranean. On 22 March 1675 Captain Edward Russel took command for service in Newfoundland until 19 June 1677. Captain David Lloyd was her commander from 4 June 1678 until 2 June 1679 for service in the English Channel. Captain Lawrence Wright took her to Newfound during his tenure as commander from 3 June 1679 until 5 June 1680. She was under command of Captain Henry Priestman while in the Mediterranean from 14 August to 13 May 1683. She was briefly under the command of Captain George Aylmer from 20 June to 13 August 1685. In August 1685 Captain Dominick Nugent took over command until 3688 as guardship at Portsmouth. In 1689 she was under Captain George Byng until Captain Richard Keigwin took over in June. Captain Thomas Crawley had command from 1691 to 1693. She was in the Mediterranean then at the Battle of Barfleur between 19 and 24 May 1692. Afterwards she escorted a convoy to Newfoundland in 1693. In 1694 she was under command of Captain James Lance at the Nore. In 1696 she came under command of Captain John Moses who first went to Jamaica in 1696, then to Newfoundland in 1697. She was placed for sale in 1698, however, she was ordered rebuilt at Deptford in 1701.

Rebuild at Deptford Dockyard 1700-01
She was ordered on 20 May 1700 to be rebuilt at Deptford Dockyard under the guidance of Master Shipwright Fisher Harding. She was launched in 1701. Her tonnage was  tons.

Under the 1703 Establishment her armament was 50 guns wartime and 46 guns peacetime and consisted of twenty/eighteen 12-pounder guns on the lower deck (LD), twenty/eighteen 6-pounder guns on the upper deck, six/four 6-pounder guns on the quarterdeck (QD) and two 6-pounder guns on the foc'x'le (Fc). Her manning under the 1703 Establishment was 230/200/160 personnel.

Service after 1700-01 Rebuild
She was commissioned in 1702 under the command of Captain Richard Haddock for service with Leake's squadron in Newfoundland waters. In 1703 she was under command of Captain John Anderson.

Loss
She foundered off Yarmouth on 27 November 1703 during the Great Storm of 1703. The captain and the purser were ashore, but Rear Admiral Beaumont and 268 other men were drowned. Only one man, whose name was Thomas Atkins, was saved. His escape was very remarkable - having first seen the rear admiral get onto a piece of her quarter-deck when the ship was breaking up, and then get washed off again, Atkins was tossed by a wave into , which sank soon after. From Stirling Castle he was swept into a boat by a wave, and was rescued.

Notes

Citations

References

 Lavery, Brian (2003) The Ship of the Line - Volume 1: The development of the battlefleet 1650-1850. Conway Maritime Press. .
 Winfield, British Warships in the Age of Sail (1603 – 1714), by Rif Winfield, published by Seaforth Publishing, England © 2009, EPUB 
 Chapter 4, The Fourth Rates - 'Small Ships', Vessels acquired from 24 March 1603, 1650 Programme, Reserve
 Fleet Actions, 3.1 Battle of Lowestoft
 Fleet Actions, 3.3 Battle of the Galloper Sand ('the Four Days' Battle')
 Fleet Actions, 3.4 Battle of Orfordness ('the St James Day Battle')
 Fleet Actions, 6.3 Battle of Barfleur
 Chapter 4, The Fourth Rates - 'Small Ships', Vessels acquired from 18 December 1688, Fourth Rates of 50 guns, Inter-War (1697-1702) Rebuilding Programme, 48-gun Type, Reserve
 Colledge, Ships of the Royal Navy, by J.J. Colledge, revised and updated by Lt Cdr Ben Warlow and Steve Bush, published by Seaforth Publishing, Barnsley, Great Britain, © 2020, EPUB , Section R (Reserve)
 Lavery, The Arming and Fitting of English Ships of War 1800 - 1815, by Brian Lavery, published by US Naval Institute Press (C) 1989, Part V Guns, Type of Guns

Ships of the line of the Royal Navy
1650s ships
Maritime incidents in 1703